Sam Edward James Grimwade (born 16 December 1997) is an Australian cricketer. He is a right-handed batsman and right-arm off-spin bowler. He made his List A debut for National Performance Squad against Australia A on 16 August 2016.

References

External links

1997 births
Living people
Australian cricketers
Cricket Australia XI cricketers
Cricketers from Victoria (Australia)